Fred Etchen (September 25, 1884 – November 6, 1961) was an American sport shooter who competed in the 1924 Summer Olympics.

In 1924, he won the gold medal as member of the American team in the team clay pigeons competition. He also participated in the Individual trap and finished 24th.

He was born in Coffeyville, Kansas.

References

External links
 
Fred Etchen at US Trapshooting Hall of Fame

1884 births
1961 deaths
People from Coffeyville, Kansas
American male sport shooters
Shooters at the 1924 Summer Olympics
Olympic gold medalists for the United States in shooting
Trap and double trap shooters
Olympic medalists in shooting
Medalists at the 1924 Summer Olympics
20th-century American people